CPMP-Tools CPMP-Tools is a free open-source software-package for Computer Algebra System (CAS). CPMP is an abbreviation for Core-Plus Mathematics Project. CPMP-Tools has a GNU-public license and works with three operating systems. CPMP-Tools is made for teaching mathematics at the high school level.

CPMP-Tools is a little similar to the two free CAS-software packages, Yacas and Xcas.

CPMP-Tools is Java-based.

Operating systems 
CPMP-Tools works for these operating systems:

 Microsoft Windows
Apple macOS
Linux

Components 
CPMP-Tools contains four parts:

Algebra Tools is computer algebra system (CAS) and spreadsheet
Geometry Tools is used for drawing geometric figures
Statistics Tools can build a uni- or biviat diagram
Discrete Math is for mathematical modeling

Features 

 factoring polynomial: factor(
solve equation: solve(
calculate derivative: diff(
calculate antiderivative: int(
 Perform Chi-squared test
 Draw graph of mathematical function.

History 
American mathematics teacher Brian Lemmen was involved in the development of CPMP-Tools. CPMP-Tools was first published in the 1990s.

References

External link 

 

Free computer algebra systems
Computer algebra system software for Windows
Computer algebra system software for macOS
Computer algebra system software for Linux
Software for teachers